Maria Karastamati (born 10 December 1984 in Piraeus) is a Greek sprinter who specializes in 60 metres and 100 metres. She was part of the Greek women's 4×100 metres relay team at the 2004 Athens Olympics.

In her first individual appearance in a major competition, at the  European Indoor Championships in Madrid she won the bronze medal with 7.25 seconds. The same year, at 100 metres she set an impressive personal best with 11.03, becoming the second fastest Greek female athlete, only behind Katerina Thanou. She made it till the semi final at the World Championships in Helsinki.

Personal bests

References

1984 births
Living people
Greek female sprinters
Athletes (track and field) at the 2004 Summer Olympics
Olympic athletes of Greece
Athletes from Piraeus
Olympic female sprinters